Magnus Lundqvist (1891–1985) was a Swedish cartographer who was the founder and director of the company Kartografiska institutet. Lundqvist did also serve as member of the board of the Swedish Society for Anthropology and Geography.

Sources

1891 births
1985 deaths
Swedish cartographers
Swedish publishers (people)
20th-century cartographers